J-Sky  is a Ferris wheel at Jakarta Garden City in Cakung, Jakarta, Indonesia. It is located on AEON Mall, Cakung, East Jakarta.

J-Sky has 32 air-conditioned passenger capsules, each able to carry up to 6 people.

References

Ferris wheels
Tourist attractions in Jakarta